Roman Bednář (born 26 March 1983) is a Czech former professional footballer.

Club career

Czech Republic
Born in Prague, Bednář started his career as a youth player at ČAFC Prague before he stepped up to Gambrinus liga side FC Bohemians Praha in 1998. In 2002, after failing to break into the first team at Bohemians, he moved to Czech Second Division side FK Mladá Boleslav. Bednář finished the 2003–04 season as top scorer with 10 goals as Mladá Boleslav won the Second Division title.

In the 2004–05 season Bednář started to come to the attention of Lithuanian scouts as his six goals helped Mladá Boleslav consolidate in the Gambrinus Liga. It was in this season that Bednář was voted as the "Revelation of the Season" as his physical strength, aerial ability, positional awareness and ability to create chances for other teammates made him a constant threat for opposition defences.

Heart of Midlothian
On 27 July 2005, Hearts announced that they had completed the signing of Bednář on a one-year loan deal from FBK Kaunas. He scored on his debut against Kilmarnock, and also in the 3–0 away victory over Dundee United. Bednář then cemented his place in Hearts folklore by scoring the only goal in the 1–0 victory over Rangers at Tynecastle. It was in this game, however, that he suffered a serious knee injury that ruled him out for most of the campaign. He made his return on 26 November against Motherwell in a 1–1 draw, and played his part in Hearts' successful second-place finish and Scottish Cup victory.

Bednář started the 2006–07 Scottish Premier League season in a rich vein of form, scoring three times, twice in the 2–1 victory over Celtic at Tynecastle.

Bednář joined Hearts on a permanent deal on 31 August 2006, but exactly a year later he moved to West Bromwich Albion on a season-long loan deal, which later turned into a permanent move.

West Bromwich Albion
Bednář scored his first goals in a West Brom shirt on 15 October 2007, netting twice in a 4–1 win for the Albion reserves against Lincoln City reserves. On 24 October, he scored a hat-trick for the reserves in a 6–1 win over Oldham Athletic reserves. He made his first team debut for Albion as a substitute in a 3–0 away win against Watford on 3 November 2007. In January 2008, Bednář scored the winning penalty in the shootout against Charlton Athletic in the FA Cup third round. He won the Midland Player of the Month award for January 2008. Bednář finished the 2007–08 season with 17 goals from 22 starts.

At the end of his loan spell, West Bromwich Albion exercised an option to purchase him. Bednář signed a three-year contract, with Albion paying Hearts £2.3 million for the player, in addition to the £200,000 loan fee they had paid previously. In the summer of 2008 he underwent a hernia operation.

Bednář was suspended by West Bromwich Albion in May 2009 over allegations that he had purchased drugs. The following month he was cautioned by West Midlands Police regarding the incident, for possessing small amounts of class A drugs (principally cocaine) as well as cannabis, a class B drug. The Football Association granted permission for Bednář to resume playing, following his suspension, and to report back for training on 17 August 2009. He returned to the side on 26 August in a League Cup tie at Rotherham United, and three days later he scored both of West Brom's goals in a 2–2 draw away to Sheffield United. On 17 October 2009, Bednář suffered a back injury (a trapped nerve) in the early stages of Albion's game against Reading. He returned to training after just over a week, and was an unused substitute in the 5–0 victory over Watford on 31 October. On 24 November 2010, Bednář joined Leicester City on loan until January 2011, making his debut in a 1–0 win over Nottingham Forest on 29 November.
West Brom accepted a £1.2 million offer from Bristol City in January 2011. However, Bednář turned down the move. Bednář subsequently joined Turkish club Ankaragücü on loan for the remainder of the 2010–11 season.

Bednář returned to the Baggies after his loan spell ended and the club took up the option to extend his contract until the end of 2011–12 season. He was assigned the squad number 43 after his previous squad number 9 had been assigned to new signing Shane Long. Bednář's only appearance during the 2011–12 season was as a substitute in a League Cup win over AFC Bournemouth in August 2011. In four-and-a-half years with West Brom, he made a total of 105 appearances, scoring 34 goals.

Blackpool
On 28 January 2012, Bednář joined Blackpool on a free transfer, signing a six-month contract. He made his debut three days later, as a late substitute against Coventry City, setting up former Baggies teammate Kevin Phillips for an 87th-minute equalizer in a 2–1 win at Bloomfield Road. He scored his first goal for the club in a substitute appearance against Leicester City on 21 March. However, he was injured and needed to be substituted less than 15 minutes after coming on.

Sivasspor
On 8 August 2012, Bednář signed a two-year contract with Turkish Süper Lig side Sivasspor.

International career
On 16 August 2006, Bednář made his debut for the Czech Republic national team in their 3–1 defeat by Serbia.

Career statistics

International goals

Honours
Heart of Midlothian
Scottish Cup: 2005–06

West Bromwich Albion
Football League Championship: 2007–08

Sparta Prague
Czech First League: 2013–14
Czech Cup: 2013–14

References

External links
 
 
 
 Roman Bednář at FK Viagem Příbram 
 
 
 Roman Bednář at londonhearts.com

1983 births
Living people
Footballers from Prague
Czech expatriate footballers
Czech footballers
Czech Republic youth international footballers
Czech Republic under-21 international footballers
Czech Republic international footballers
Association football forwards
Czech First League players
FK Mladá Boleslav players
AC Sparta Prague players
1. FK Příbram players
Expatriate footballers in England
Czech expatriate sportspeople in Scotland
Expatriate footballers in Lithuania
Czech expatriate sportspeople in Lithuania
Expatriate footballers in Scotland
Expatriate footballers in Turkey
Czech expatriate sportspeople in Turkey
Heart of Midlothian F.C. players
West Bromwich Albion F.C. players
Leicester City F.C. players
MKE Ankaragücü footballers
Blackpool F.C. players
Sivasspor footballers
Scottish Premier League players
Premier League players
English Football League players
Süper Lig players
Czech expatriate sportspeople in England